"The Kids" is the first single taken from British funk/acid jazz band Jamiroquai's second studio album, The Return of the Space Cowboy, though it was recorded shortly after the Emergency on Planet Earth sessions and was not a worldwide single release. The single was only released in Japan, on 30 June 1994. "The Kids" is a song that deals with the rights of children and their social status in the world. The song is written to be absurdly loud and high in tempo, to possibly represent the immaturity of children, and more generally the whole early childhood of a person, which is usually a carefree time of life.

Background
After "The Kids" was recorded with drummer Nick Van Gelder, all Space Cowboy tracks except "The Kids" were re-recorded with Derrick McKenzie on drums.

Track listing
 Japanese CD single
 "The Kids" - 4:13
 "When You Gonna Learn" (Live At Leadmill, Sheffield) - 9:51
 "When You Gonna Learn" (Digeridoo Instrumental) - 6:31

References

1994 songs
1995 singles
Jamiroquai songs
Songs written by Jason Kay
Songs written by Toby Smith
Epic Records singles